The Tumen Border Bridge is a bridge over the Tumen River, connecting Tumen City, Jilin Province, China, with Namyang, Onsong County, North Hamgyong Province, North Korea. It was built in 1941 by the Japanese and is 515 metres long, 6 metres high, 6 metres wide.   Tumen Border Post is located there. A little upstream from the bridge is Tumen Border Railway Bridge.

During the Korean War, it was one of the border posts from which the Chinese People's Volunteer Army entered North Korea.

A parallel, larger bridge is under construction since 2016. The new bridge was completed on 2019.

See also
 Sino–Korean Friendship Bridge and New Yalu River Bridge (Dandong City)
 Ji'an Yalu River Border Railway Bridge
 Changbai-Hyesan International Bridge
 Linjiang Yalu River Bridge
 Tumen River Bridge (Hunchun City)

External links 

 Panorama view of the bridge and border checkpoint

References

International bridges
Bridges in North Korea
Buildings and structures in North Hamgyong Province
Bridges in China
Buildings and structures in Jilin
Transport in Jilin
China–North Korea border crossings
Bridges completed in 1941
1941 establishments in China
1941 establishments in Korea